Dicuspiditermes nemorosus, is a species of small termite of the genus Dicuspiditermes. It is found in Sri Lanka, India, Malaysia and Borneo. The species is known to build three different types of mounding nests, where two termitaria have single protruding nest structure and third nest type is typified by several protruding nest all connected at the base.

References

External links
The role of termites in an equatorial rain forest ecosystem of West Malaysia : I. Population density, biomass, carbon, nitrogen and calorific content and respiration rate.
Studies on the taxonomy and biology of termites (Isoptera) of Peninsular Malaysia
TAXONOMIC QUESTIONS ON MALAYSIAN TERMITES (ISOPTERA: TERMITIDAE) ANSWERED WITH MORPHOLOGY AND DNA BIOTECHNOLOGY
Observations on the biology of the termite dicuspiditermes nemorosus
The electrophoretic mobilities of total protein systems in different castes of four termite species
Termite assemblages in two distinct montane forest types at 1000 m elevation in the Maliau Basin, Sabah
Termite assemblages, forest disturbance and greenhouse gas fluxes in Sabah, East Malaysia
Evolution and Systematic Significance of Wing Micro-sculpturing
Relation between termite numbers and the size of their mounds

Insects described in 1898
Termites